Tarata is one of four provinces in the Tacna Region in southern Peru. Its capital is Tarata city.

Geography 
The Tarata Province is bounded to the north by the Candarave Province and the Puno Region, to the east by Bolivia, and to the south and west by the Tacna Province.

The Barroso mountain range traverses the district. Some of the highest mountains of the province are listed below:

Political division
The province is divided into eight districts (singular: distrito), each of which is headed by a mayor (alcalde):

Chucatamani
Estique
Estique-Pampa
Sitajara
Susapaya
Tarata
Tarucachi
Ticaco

Ethnic groups 
The province is inhabited by indigenous citizens of Aymara descent. Spanish, however, is the language which the majority of the population (82.31%) learnt to speak in childhood, 17.12% of the residents started speaking using the Aymara language (2007 Peru Census).

See also 
 Pharaquta
 Wilaquta

Sources 

Provinces of the Tacna Region